Howard Township may refer to:

Canada
 Howard Township, Ontario

United States

Arkansas
 Howard Township, Conway County, Arkansas, in Conway County, Arkansas

Indiana
 Howard Township, Howard County, Indiana
 Howard Township, Parke County, Indiana
 Howard Township, Washington County, Indiana

Iowa
 Howard Township, Howard County, Iowa
 Howard Township, Story County, Iowa
 Howard Township, Tama County, Iowa
 Howard Township, Wayne County, Iowa

Kansas
 Howard Township, Elk County, Kansas
 Howard Township, Labette County, Kansas, in Labette County, Kansas

Michigan
 Howard Township, Michigan

Missouri
 Howard Township, Bates County, Missouri
 Howard Township, Gentry County, Missouri

Ohio
 Howard Township, Knox County, Ohio

Pennsylvania
 Howard Township, Pennsylvania

South Dakota
 Howard Township, Charles Mix County, South Dakota, in Charles Mix County, South Dakota
 Howard Township, Meade County, South Dakota, in Meade County, South Dakota
 Howard Township, Miner County, South Dakota, in Miner County, South Dakota

Township name disambiguation pages